Eagle Butte School may refer to:

United States
 Cheyenne-Eagle Butte School, In Eagle Butte, South Dakota
 Eagle Butte School, on the NRHP in Chouteau County, Montana